Project Kalina is a proposed fifth-generation diesel-electric submarine currently being developed by TsKB Rubin and others, for the Russian Navy. It will be fitted with air-independent propulsion technology, and copies may also be sold to China. 

As of 2021, the project had lost government funding, according to the Russian state-owned RIA Novosti news agency. As a result, it was being self-funded by Rubin, the developer.

See also
 List of Soviet and Russian submarine classes
 Future of the Russian Navy
 Cruise missile submarine
 Attack submarine

References

Russian and Soviet navy submarine classes
Attack submarines